This is a list of Bien de Interés Cultural landmarks in the Province of Córdoba, Spain.

Alcázar de los Reyes Cristianos
Calahorra Tower
Castle of Belalcázar
Castle of Bujalance
Castillo de las Escobetas
Castillo de Iznájar
Córdoba Synagogue
Minaret of the Convento de Santa Clara (Córdoba)
Convento de Santa Cruz
Cueva de los Murciélagos
Medina Azahara
Mosque–Cathedral of Córdoba
Nuestra Señora de la Asunción, Bujalance
Palacio de la Merced
Plaza del Potro
Puerta del Puente
Roman bridge of Córdoba
Roman temple of Córdoba
San Lorenzo
San Miguel, Córdoba
San Nicolás de la Villa
San Pablo
San Pedro
Santa Marina

References 

Cordoba